Grzegorz Skwara (born August 2, 1975, in Blachownia) is a retired Polish footballer.

Career

Club
In the summer 2010, he moved to MKS Kluczbork from Flota Świnoujście on a one-year contract.
He left this club on 27 November 2010.

Since 11 January 2011 he is Olimpia Elbląg player.

References

External links
 

1975 births
Living people
Polish footballers
Raków Częstochowa players
FC Solothurn players
Ruch Chorzów players
Ceramika Opoczno players
Górnik Łęczna players
KSZO Ostrowiec Świętokrzyski players
A.P.S. Zakynthos players
Flota Świnoujście players
MKS Kluczbork players
Olimpia Elbląg players
Kotwica Kołobrzeg footballers
People from Częstochowa County
Sportspeople from Silesian Voivodeship
Association football midfielders
Polish expatriate footballers
Expatriate footballers in Switzerland
Polish expatriate sportspeople in Switzerland
Expatriate footballers in Greece
Polish expatriate sportspeople in Greece
Expatriate footballers in Germany
Polish expatriate sportspeople in Germany